D'Arnaud's barbet (Trachyphonus darnaudii) is a species of African barbet. Barbets and toucans are a group of near passerine birds with a worldwide tropical distribution. The barbets get their name from the bristles which fringe their heavy bills. Four geographical races (darnaudii, böhmi, emini and usambiro) have been recorded. The 2021 taxonomic update to the IOC World Bird List upgraded the usambiro subspecies to species status as Usambiro barbet / Trachyphonus usambiro.

D'Arnaud's barbet is a small East African bird that feeds on insects, fruits, and seeds. It grows to about eight inches, and is equally at home in trees or on the ground.  A vertical tunnel two to three feet into the ground with a sideways and upward turn leads to the nest chamber. In a striking dance the male and female face each on nearby twigs and twitch, bob and sing like mechanical toys.

The species was named in honour of the French explorer and engineer Joseph Pons d'Arnaud.

References

D'Arnaud's barbet
Birds of East Africa
D'Arnaud's barbet
D'Arnaud's barbet